Podplešivica is a settlement in the Municipality of Brezovica in central Slovenia. It lies in the marshlands south of the capital Ljubljana between Notranje Gorice and Log pri Brezovici. The municipality is part of the traditional region of Inner Carniola and is now included in the Central Slovenia Statistical Region.

History
Podplešivica was formerly a hamlet of Plešivica. It became an independent settlement in 1987.

Kuschlan Manor

Podplešivica is the site of Kuschlan Manor, also known as Kršljan Manor. The manor was built below Vrbič Hill in 1453. Because the wet ground of the marsh made it accessible from only one side, the manor was also known as Za blatom (literally, 'behind the mud', also Zaplata) in Slovene, or Moosthal in German. It was first owned by the Mavrič family, later by the Gallen family, and from 1663 to 1826 by the barons of the Kuschlan family. It was considerably damaged by the 1895 Ljubljana earthquake.

References

External links

Podplešivica on Geopedia

Populated places in the Municipality of Brezovica